Jamie Reed (born 1973) is a British politician.

Jamie Reed may also refer to:

Jamie Reed (footballer) (born 1987)
Jamie Reed (The Only Way is Essex)

See also
Jamie Reid (disambiguation)
James Reed (disambiguation)